Amiran Shota Revishvili, born February 11, 1956, is a cardiac electrophysiologist, president of Pan-Russian Scientific Society of Clinical Electrophysiology, Arrhythmology and Cardiac Pacing.

Key positions and honours 
 Pan-Russian Scientific Society of Clinical Electrophysiology, Arrhythmology and Cardiac Pacing, founding president
 Center of Surgical and Interventional Arrhythmology, Ministry of Health of the Russian Federation, executive director
 Department of Tachiarrhytmias, Bakulev Scientific Center of Cardiovascular Surgery, chief
 Russian Academy of Medical Sciences, member, 2011
 Russian Academy of Sciences, member, 2013
State Prize of the Russian Federation, 2016

References 

Cardiac electrophysiologists
Russian cardiologists
Russian people of Georgian descent
Living people
1956 births